Belisarius Begging for Alms is a large-format (288 × 312 cm) history painting in oil on canvas by the French artist Jacques-Louis David. It depicts the Byzantine general Belisarius, who heroically defeated the Vandals in North Africa in AD 533–534 on behalf of Justinian I, and (according to an apocryphal account probably added to his biography in the Middle Ages) was later blinded by the emperor and reduced to begging for alms on the street. David exhibited the work at the Salon of 1781 after returning from Italy and it proved a great success.

It is now in the Palais des Beaux-Arts in Lille.

Themes
The theme of mercy is omnipresent in the work, focusing on the three people considered most "based": the woman, the child and the old man who embodies the image of Mercy. The hands of these three individuals horizontally convey the idea of weakness involving need and love. The soldier, meanwhile, in the background, lifts his hands vertically to show his astonishment, with his chest forward. The three human ages represented give an idea of the glory of youth and the wreck of old age.

Style
The same subject had already been used by Peyron in his own Belisarius receiving Hospitality from a Peasant; in contrast, only a few characters are present here and the scene is dependent on the story for dramatic effect. David shows us a fallen hero, old and blind, begging in the street with a young child when one of his former soldiers, astonished, recognises him.

The setting is Antique: sober, austere and overwhelming architecture is placed behind the depiction of harsh conditions. This shows that the artist wanted to associate Greek style with heroic themes in the context of the concerns of the artist's time. Essentially, it is through the theme of virtues borrowed from ancient times that the "true style", later called neo-classical, spread into art, rejecting the frivolities of the royal court of Louis XVI at the time of the French revolution. In the very composition of the work of David, however, the essence of the tableau juxtaposes several rococo ideas, and is thus not a completely neo-classical work. Nonetheless, the neo-classical perspective can still be found, especially in the ideas behind this painting: a revolutionary (David) offers a meditation on the moral heroism in adversity.

The artist returned to the subject in 1784, producing a smaller canvas with minor changes which is in the collection of the Louvre.

1781 paintings
Paintings by Jacques-Louis David
Byzantine Empire in art and culture
Paintings in the collection of the Palais des Beaux-Arts de Lille
Paintings of children